Yves Hanson-Nortey (born 20 April 1983) is a Ghanaian politician and member of the New Patriotic Party. He represents Tema Central Constituency in the 8th parliament of the 4th Republic in Ghana.

Early life 
Hanson-Nortey was born on 20 April 1983. He hails from Takoradi in the Western Region of Ghana.

Political career 
Hanson-Nortey was elected member of parliament for Tema Central constituency in the 2020 Ghanaian general elections. He won by pulling 31,121 votes, representing, 65.04% of total votes cast.

References 

1983 births
Living people
Ghanaian MPs 2021–2025
New Patriotic Party politicians